The name Agaton has been used for six tropical cyclones in the Philippines by PAGASA in the Western Pacific.
 Tropical Storm Tapah (2002) (T0201, 01W, Agaton)
 Tropical Depression Agaton (2006) (Agaton) - weakened as it crossed over northern Samar and southern Luzon
 Tropical Storm Omais (2010) (T1001, 02W, Agaton) – did not make landfall
 Tropical Storm Lingling (2014) (T1401, 01W, Agaton) – affected the Philippines early in the year.
 Tropical Storm Bolaven (2018) (T1801, 01W, Agaton) – affected southern parts of the Philippines early in January.
 Tropical Storm Megi (2022) (T2202, 03W, Agaton) – deadly tropical storm in the Eastern Visayas.

Pacific typhoon set index articles